Josef Franz Leo Schwammberger (14 February 1912 – 3 December 2004) was a member of the SS (Schutzstaffel) during the Nazi era.

Biography
During the Second World War, Schwammberger was a commander of various SS Arbeitslager (forced-labor camps) in the Kraków district (late August 1942 until spring 1944).

He was arrested in Innsbruck, Austria, in the French occupation zone after the war on 19 July 1945, but escaped in January 1948 and within months was able to enter Argentina, where he lived under his own name and obtained citizenship. West German authorities sought his extradition beginning in 1973, and Argentine officials tracked him down on 13 November 1987.  After two years of fighting extradition, he was returned to West Germany in May 1990 for trial. His capture cost the German state of Baden-Württemberg just under 500,000 Deutschmark.

At his trial, which lasted nearly a year (1991 until 1992), Schwammberger denied being guilty of the crimes of which he was charged; he simply admitted that "Ghetto A" was taken to the Przemyśl camp. On 18 May 1992 he was sentenced by the Stuttgart regional court (Landgericht) to life imprisonment, which he was to serve in Mannheim. He was found guilty of seven counts of murder and 32 counts of being an accessory to murder.

In August 2002, the Mannheim regional court declined a parole request due to the unusual cruelty of his offences; he had been found guilty of carrying out arbitrary murders based on racial hatred against Jewish people.

His wife Käthe Schwammberger died in 2003 at the age of 87 in Argentina before Schwammberger himself died in prison on 3 December 2004, aged 92.

The Simon Wiesenthal Center was instrumental in bringing him to justice. Also contributing to the case against Schwammberger, including his extradition from Argentina, was Elliot Welles and Anna Unger Weinberg.

References

Other sources

 
 

1912 births
2004 deaths
People from Brixen
SS non-commissioned officers
German prisoners sentenced to life imprisonment
Prisoners sentenced to life imprisonment by Germany
Nazis who died in prison custody
Prisoners who died in German detention
People convicted of murder by Germany
German people convicted of murder
People extradited from Argentina
People extradited to Germany
Nazi concentration camp commandants
Holocaust perpetrators in Poland